Fritz Wilhelm von Essen (16 February 1879 – 10 April 1972) Baron, and master of the royal stable was a Swedish horse rider. He competed in the individual mixed dressage at the 1920 and 1924 Summer Olympics and placed fourth on both occasions.

References

1879 births
1972 deaths
Olympic equestrians of Sweden
Swedish male equestrians
Equestrians at the 1920 Summer Olympics
Equestrians at the 1924 Summer Olympics
Swedish Army officers